The 2nd Reserve Infantry Division of Beijing() was a reserve infantry formation of the People's Liberation Army.

The formation of the division started on July 15, 1983. The division was formally activated on February 1, 1985.

The division was then composed of:
4th Regiment - Changping, Beijing
5th Regiment - Yanqing, Beijing
6th Regiment - Fangshan, Beijing
Artillery Regiment
Tank Regiment - Fengtai, Beijing

However, the Tank Regiment was deactivated on October 4, 1984, before the activation of the division.

The division was disbanded in 1998. The division, combined with the 1st Reserve Infantry Division of Beijing, reorganized into the Reserve Antiaircraft Artillery Division of Beijing Guard District.

References

Reserve divisions of the People's Liberation Army
Military units and formations established in 1984